Paula Dvorak (sometimes credited as Paula Dworak) was an Austrian film editor active from the 1930s through the 1970s.

Career 
Dvorak began training in editing with Sascha-Film in 1932. She and Annemarie Reisetbauer were among the only women editors active in the postwar Austrian film industry; they often worked together on projects.

Selected filmography 
 Marika (1950)
 A Night in Venice (1953)
 The Last Bridge (1954)
 Three Men in the Snow (1955)
  (1956)
 Mikosch of the Secret Service (1959)
 Die unvollkommene Ehe (1959)
 Everyman (1961)
 Der rote Rausch (1962)
 The Black Cobra (1963)
 Herzog Blaubarts Burg (1963, TV film)

References

External links 

 

Women film editors
Austrian film editors
1913 births
1995 deaths